Damian David Harris (born 2 August 1958) is a British film director and screenwriter. He is the eldest son of the actor Richard Harris and socialite Elizabeth Rees-Williams.

Career
In 1968, Harris debuted on screen playing Miles in the film Otley. At the age of 16, he appeared on his father's album of poetry and songs, I, in the membership of my days, together with his brothers Jared and Jamie. Harris attended Downside School, Somerset, England. Later he studied screenwriting at New York University.

He debuted as a director with short movies Killing Time (with Eric Stoltz) and Greasy Lake and then moved to full-length movies debuting with The Rachel Papers, the adaptation of Martin Amis' novel. He has also directed episodes for several television series.

Personal life
Harris was born on 2 August 1958 in London, the eldest of three sons of the Irish actor Richard Harris and his first wife, Welsh actress Elizabeth Rees-Williams. His brothers are actors Jared Harris and Jamie Harris.

In 1981, Harris married British actress Annabel Brooks. They have one child together, daughter Ella. Later the pair divorced. From 1997, up until their separation in 2002, Harris lived with Australian model and actress Peta Wilson. They have one child together, son Marlowe, born in February 2002.

Filmography

Director

Actor

References

External links

1958 births
Living people
English male screenwriters
English people of Irish descent
English people of Welsh descent
English screenwriters
Film directors from London
People educated at Downside School